Several television series and features were produced that were based on the Sonic the Hedgehog series of video games, developed by Sega.

Television series/specials

Adventures of Sonic the Hedgehog (1993–1996)

Adventures of Sonic the Hedgehog was the first Sonic television series, produced by DiC Entertainment, Bohbot Entertainment and Fininvest, and airing in 1993; the series consisted of 65 episodes, most of which follow Sonic and Tails as they attempt to stop Doctor Robotnik's tyranny. At the end of every episode is a short PSA titled "Sonic Says" where Sonic teaches the audience a lesson.

The series has received mixed reviews, although the series has spawned several internet memes and is a major source in YouTube Poop material. Three years after the series completed its original run, a Christmas special titled Sonic Christmas Blast was aired in 1996; the special was originally intended to tie-in with Sonic X-treme, and was produced under the title X-tremely Sonic Christmas; however, its cancellation resulted in the special being rebranded as a tie-in to Sonic 3D Blast.

Sonic the Hedgehog (1993–1994)
The second of DiC's Sonic cartoons, Sonic the Hedgehog (more commonly known as Sonic SatAM) aired from September 18, 1993, to December 3, 1994, lasting two 13 episode seasons; considered one of the darker incarnations of Sonic, SatAM takes place in a time where Robotnik successfully took over Mobius, with Sonic and a team called the Freedom Fighters attempting to take back the planet.

Originally intended to last three seasons, Sonic the Hedgehog was cancelled after its second season, which left the show on a cliffhanger where Ixis Naugus would become the new antagonist; since its release, the series has become a cult classic, inspiring a video game titled Sonic Spinball and the Archie Comics series.

Sonic the Hedgehog: The Movie (1996)

, also known as simply Sonic the Hedgehog, is an original video animation (OVA) produced by Studio Pierrot and General Entertainment, and directed by Hazuzo Ikegami, with supervision from Sonic Team; in the OVA, Sonic and Tails head to Eggmanland to stop a generator from destroying Planet Freedom, only for Sonic to have his DNA copied into a doppelganger named Hyper Metal Sonic.

The North American release, handled by ADV Films, was combined and released on September 7, 1999, with it being marketed as a film; the release coincided with the release of Sonic Adventure internationally.

The OVA was met with mixed reception; much of the criticism came from the English dub, which many saw as subpar.

Sonic Underground (1999)
The third and final DiC Sonic cartoon, Sonic Underground aired in 1999 and lasted only one season with 40 episodes; the series takes inspiration from the SatAM series, where a princess hedgehog Queen Aleena gives birth to three hedgehogs, Sonic, Sonia and Manic, on the same day as Robotnik's take over of Mobotropolis; Aleena separates her three children, who years later join a rebellion to take back the planet; every episode of the show includes a musical number near the end. The series was commissioned as a way to promote the Dreamcast.

Unlike the previous two series, Sonic Underground has been met with a generally negative reception from media critics for its confusing plot, although praise has been given to the series' musical numbers. Originally, a conclusion for the series was planned to be included in issue #50 of the Sonic Universe comic; however, it was later replaced due to license issues.

Sonic X (2003–2005) 

 is a Japanese anime created by TMS Entertainment under a partnership with Sega and Sonic Team. In the series, after an infiltration into Eggman's base goes wrong, Sonic and his friends are transported to a parallel world inhabited by humans where they met a 12-year-old boy named Christopher Thorndyke, who helps Sonic along with his friends to take on Eggman continuously while trying to retrieve all seven Chaos Emeralds so that they would return home. The series initially ran for two 26 episode seasons on TV Tokyo from April 6, 2003 to March 28, 2004.

Internationally, Sonic X was dubbed by 4Kids Entertainment and ran from September 6, 2003, to March 26, 2005; although the series suffered from low ratings in Japan, it was large success internationally, with 4Kids commissioning a third season of 26 episodes; season three, dubbed "The Metarex Saga" sees Sonic and his friends including Chris, and a new character introduced in the third season, a plant-like creature named Cosmo, traveling across planets to retrieve the Chaos Emeralds in order to stop an alien race called the Metarex. Season three was never released on DVD in Japan, nor was aired on television over there until 2020, although it was later made available via streaming services.

The series has received generally average reviews from critics, although the English dub was heavily criticised for its censorship and English voice acting. The voice actors who participated in the English dub would later replace the original English video game cast from Sonic Adventure to Sonic Advance 3.

Sonic Boom (2014–2017) 
Sonic Boom is an American-French CGI animated series produced by OuiDo! Productions and distributed on Cartoon Network, Canal J and Gulli; the series takes place on an island called Bygone Island and has Sonic and his friends attempt to stop Dr. Eggman's plans; the series ran from November 8, 2014, to November 18, 2017, having two 52 episode seasons.

The television series is part of a larger spin-off also known as Sonic Boom; according to Takashi Iizuka, head of Sonic Team, Sonic Boom was designed to appeal to Western fans. The series also spans three video games (Rise of Lyric, Shattered Crystal and Fire & Ice), a comic book and a toyline by Tomy. The series was met with positive reviews.

As of May 21, 2020, it was confirmed by Bill Freiberger that there are no plans to continue the series.

Let's Meet Sonic (2019) 

Let's Meet Sonic is a crossover special with Cartoon Network animated series OK K.O.! Let's Be Heroes. Announced at San Diego Comic-Con 2019, the special debuted on August 4th of that year as an episode of the show's third season.

Sonic Prime (2022)

Sonic Prime is an animated series co-produced by Sega, Netflix Animation, WildBrain and Man of Action Entertainment; it sees Sonic needing to travel across an accidentally-created multiverse, with themes of self-discovery and redemption. The series was officially announced on February 1, 2021, although its existence was accidentally leaked in December 2020 with a now-deleted Twitter post.

The series was released on December 15, 2022, with 8 episodes in its first season. It received generally favorable reviews.

Untitled Knuckles series (2023) 
In February 2022, ViacomCBS (later renamed Paramount Global) announced that a television series centered around Knuckles the Echidna is in development, with it set for release in 2023 on Paramount+.

Films
Attempts had been made as early as 1993 to get Sonic made into a film; the first of these was Sonic the Hedgehog: Wonders of the World, which was pitched to MGM in August 1994 and had Sonic coming into the real world of a kid named Josh, and fighting Eggman (Robotnik). The film would've tied-in to the cancelled Sega Saturn game Sonic X-treme, and despite a positive internal reception, MGM would drop the project without warning. Writer Richard Jefferies suggests the film was dropped due to creative differences between Sega and Trilogy Entertainment Group, who were also producing the film.

Ben Hurst had also attempted to make Sonic the Hedgehog into a film, this time based on the aforementioned SatAM series; the project was dismissed after former comic series writer Ken Penders allegedly told a Sega representative that Hurst was attempting to "co-opt" the franchise. Penders proposed his own film titled Sonic Armageddon in September 2003, which would have incorporated elements from SatAM and the Archie Comics series, but was itself dropped in 2007 due to massive corporate upheaval, and the death of Sega license manager Robert Leffler. The original pitch video still exists, and was uploaded to YouTube in 2017.

Sonic the Hedgehog (2020)
Sonic the Hedgehog is an action-adventure comedy film directed by Jeff Fowler and written by Pat Casey and Josh Miller; in the film, Sonic is forced to abandon his home world and ends up on Earth, and eventually is forced to team up with a human named Tom Wachoski to stop Dr. Robotnik; it was originally released in theaters on February 14, 2020.

Originally intended for release in late-2019, Sonic the Hedgehog ended up being pushed back several months due to the overwhelmingly negative response to Sonic's design in the trailer; upon its release, the film was met with mixed reviews from critics, although it was a large commercial success, being the sixth-highest-grossing film in 2020.

Sonic the Hedgehog 2 (2022)

Sonic the Hedgehog 2 is an American action-adventure comedy film based on the video game franchise published by Sega. Directed by Jeff Fowler and written by Pat Casey, Josh Miller and John Whittington, it is the sequel to Sonic the Hedgehog (2020). Ben Schwartz reprises his role as the voice of Sonic the Hedgehog, alongside Jim Carrey as Dr. Robotnik, with James Marsden and Tika Sumpter in the roles of Tom and Maddie Wachowski, while Idris Elba joins the cast as Knuckles the Echidna. After the events of the first film, Sonic joins forces with Miles "Tails" Prower to stop Dr. Robotnik and Knuckles from finding a powerful emerald that has the power to build and destroy civilizations.

Sonic the Hedgehog 2 was released in the United States on April 8, 2022, by Paramount Pictures in association with Sega Sammy Group.

Sonic the Hedgehog 3 (2024)

In February 2022, Sega and Paramount confirmed that a third film was in development. On August 8, 2022, it was announced that the third film would be released on December 20, 2024.

Box office performance

Web series

Sonic: Night of the Werehog (2008)
Sonic: Night of the Werehog is the first web animation, released on November 21, 2008, and produced by Marza Animation Planet, created to promote the release of  Sonic Unleashed. In the short, Sonic and Chip enter a haunted house and must contend with two ghosts, who attempt to take pictures of scared visitors to appease a female ghost. It is the only 3D Sonic web animation.

Sonic Mania Adventures (2018)
Sonic Mania Adventures is the second web animation, initially released as five parts between March 31 and July 18, 2018, as a tie-in to Sonic Mania Plus. The series takes place shortly after the events of Sonic Forces, as Classic Sonic arrives back in his world to find Eggman is once again attempting to collect all the Chaos Emeralds. It was produced by Neko Productions and animated by Tyson Hesse, with supervision from Sega.

The series received generally favorable reviews from various critics, who praised the animation and writing. A Christmas-themed bonus episode, starring Amy Rose, was released on December 21, 2018, a few months after its initial completion.

Team Sonic Racing Overdrive (2019)
Team Sonic Racing Overdrive is the third web animation, released as a two-part series in March and April 2019. The miniseries is a promotional tie-in to Team Sonic Racing, and features Sonic, Shadow, and Amy's teams competing in a race while Eggman tries to interfere.

Chao in Space (2019)
Chao in Space is the fourth web animation, released on December 13, 2019. In the short, a Chao dreams up the events of a fictional film titled Chao in Space, in which it endures a spaceship battle against a Dark Chao. As it sleeps, Sonic attempts to prevent the sleepwalking Chao from injuring itself, while Dr. Eggman disguises himself as Santa Claus to try to steal Christmas presents. The animation is based on a gag from Sonic Adventure and Sonic Adventure 2, which both feature faux advertisements for Chao in Space and its sequel Chao in Space 2's release on DVD.

Sonic Colors: Rise of the Wisps (2021)

Sonic Colors: Rise of the Wisps is the fifth web animation, released in Summer 2021 as a two-episode miniseries, created as a tie-in to the release of Sonic Colors: Ultimate. The series takes place during the game, and follows Sonic and Tails as they work to save the Wisps from imprisonment by Metal Sonic and Eggman's two henchmen, Orbot and Cubot.

Sonic Frontiers Prologue: Divergence (2022)

Sonic Frontiers Prologue: Divergence is the sixth web animation, released on November 1, 2022. The short was written by Ian Flynn and directed by Tyson Hesse, with animation by Powerhouse Animation Studios. Set shortly before the events of Sonic Frontiers, the short explains from Knuckles' point of view, how he was sent to the Starfall Islands.

See also
List of Sonic the Hedgehog printed media
List of Sonic the Hedgehog video games
List of Sonic the Hedgehog video game characters
List of television programs based on video games

Notes

References